Poteaux-sur-sol ("posts on a sill" – sol is also spelled sole and solle) is a style of timber framing in which relatively closely spaced posts rest on a timber sill. Poteaux-en-terre and pieux-en-terre are similar, but the closely spaced posts extend into the ground rather than resting on a sill on a foundation, and therefore are a type of post in ground construction. Poteaux-sur-sol is similar to the framing style known in the United Kingdom as close studding. Poteaux-sur-sol has also, confusingly, been used for other types of timber framing which have a sill timber such as post-and-plank, but this is considered incorrect by some scholars.

Poteaux-sur-sol is a part of American historic carpentry but is known by its French name in North America, as it was used by French and French-Canadian people in the region historically known as New France.  Besides its appearance in French colonial architecture, it was also used in the 19th century by Ukrainian peasants living on the open steppes, or anywhere there was a timber shortage.

United States 
In the present-day United States, houses in this style can be found in Ste. Genevieve, Missouri; Prairie du Rocher, Illinois, and former French settlements in Louisiana—all former parts of New France (La Louisiane). Most are listed on the National Register of Historic Places; Maison Bolduc is a National Historic Landmark.

Canada

Gallery

See also 
French architecture
French colonization of the Americas
Creole House
Pierrotage

References 

Timber framing
Colonial architecture in the United States
French colonial architecture
Architecture in Ukraine
New France
French-Canadian culture in the United States
French-American culture in Missouri
Missouri culture